Zádveřice-Raková is a municipality in Zlín District in the Zlín Region of the Czech Republic. It has about 1,500 inhabitants.

Administrative parts
Zádveřice-Raková is made up of villages of Zádveřice and Raková.

History
The first written mention of Zádveřice is from 1261 and of Raková from 1549. Zádveřice and Raková merged in 1960.

Gallery

References

Villages in Zlín District